Modella is a locality in Victoria, Australia,  south-east of Melbourne's central business district, located within the Shires of Baw Baw and Cardinia local government areas. Modella recorded a population of 169 at the 2021 census.

History

Modella Post Office opened on 2 December 1904 and closed in 1962.

References

Towns in Victoria (Australia)
Shire of Cardinia